Denys Pouncey (1906–1999) was an English cathedral organist, who served in Wells Cathedral

Background

Denys Duncan Rivers Pouncey was born on 23 December 1906 and was educated at Marlborough College and Queens' College, Cambridge.

In 1935 he founded the Northampton Bach Choir.

From April 1943 to April 1946 he served in the Royal Air Force and his duties at Wells Cathedral were filled by Revd. H.G. Bawtree-Williams, an amateur organist from Hampshire.

Career

Assistant organist of:
St. John's College, Cambridge 1928–1934

Organist of:
St Matthew's Church, Northampton 1934–1936
Wells Cathedral 1936–1970

References

English classical organists
British male organists
Cathedral organists
Alumni of Queens' College, Cambridge
People educated at Marlborough College
1906 births
1999 deaths
20th-century classical musicians
20th-century English musicians
20th-century organists
20th-century British male musicians
20th-century British musicians
Male classical organists